Sardis Lake is a  reservoir on the Tallahatchie River in Lafayette, Panola, and Marshall counties, Mississippi. It is approximately an hour drive from Memphis, Tennessee.

History
Sardis Dam was the first of the Yazoo River headwaters projects to be built by the federal government for flood control. Authorization for the project came when President Franklin D. Roosevelt signed the [[Flood 
ontrol Act of 1936]]. Construction took four years and required thousands of men to clear  along the Tallahatchie River, which was characterized by dense woods and undergrowth, and meandering sloughs.

The dam was constructed using a "hydraulic fill" technique that required soil to be dredged from below the dam site and pumped to form the earth fill, which forms the majority of the dam. The U.S. Army Corps of Engineers built and operated the "Pontotoc", a special dredge powered by two  electric motors to accomplish this task. The  "Lower Lake" on the downstream side of Sardis Dam was created by the dredging operation. It has numerous recreation facilities, including John W. Kyle State Park. Mississippi Highway 315 splits while crossing the dam, with one route crossing the top and the other half crossing the base.

This permits spring rains across the lake's  watershed to fill the reservoir without flooding downstream. Since the dam became operational, the dam's emergency spillway has been overtopped only three times by high water - in 1973, 1983 and 1991.

The lake is popular with anglers and has a reputation for its abundant bass and crappie. Other recreation activities include hunting, camping, boating, skiing, swimming and picnicking.

Marina
The Sardis Lake Marina services the lake with access to fuel docks, 140 wet slips (both covered and uncovered), a restaurant, and a ship store. The Marina offers rental boats as well as rental skis, tubes, and knee/wake boards.

Fish
The main fish that live in the lake are Largemouth bass, Spotted bass, Blue catfish, Channel catfish, Flathead catfish, Black crappie, White crappie, Bluegill, Redear sunfish, White bass.

External links

Sardis Lake and Dam (Official Website), U.S. Army Corps of Engineers
http://sardis.uslakes.info/FishingChart.asp

References

Protected areas of Lafayette County, Mississippi
Protected areas of Marshall County, Mississippi
Protected areas of Panola County, Mississippi
Reservoirs in Mississippi
Dams in Mississippi
United States Army Corps of Engineers dams
Landforms of Lafayette County, Mississippi
Landforms of Marshall County, Mississippi
Landforms of Panola County, Mississippi